The 2010 edition of the Lebanese FA Cup is the 38th edition to be played. It is the premier knockout tournament for football teams in Lebanon.

Al-Ahed  went into this edition as the holders. Al Ansar holds the most wins with 11 titles.

The cup winner were guaranteed a place in the 2011 AFC Cup.

Round 1

18 teams play a knockout tie. 8 clubs advance to the next round. Ties played on 9 and 10 January 2010

Quarter-finals 

8 teams play a knockout tie. 4 clubs advance to the next round. Ties played on 30 and 31 January 2010

Semi-finals 

4 teams play a knockout tie. 2 clubs advance to the final. Ties played on 10 and 11 April 2010

Final

References

Lebanese FA Cup seasons
Cup
Leb